The following is a list of Burundian musicians.

H
Happy Famba

D
Double Jay

K
Kebby Boy
Kidum
Khadja Nin

M
Miss Erica
Masterland

S
Sat-B

T
T-Max

Musicians
Burundi